Steven Toll Okazaki (born March 12, 1952) is an American documentary filmmaker known for his raw, cinéma vérité-style documentaries that frequently show ordinary people dealing with extraordinary circumstances. He has received a Peabody Award, a Primetime Emmy and has been nominated for four Academy Awards, winning an Oscar for the documentary short subject, Days of Waiting: The Life & Art of Estelle Ishigo.

Career
Steven Okazaki started his career at Churchill Films in 1976, making narrative and documentary shorts. In 1982, he produced Survivors for WGBH Boston, a documentary short about Hiroshima and Nagasaki atomic bomb survivors. In 1985, he received his first Academy Award nomination for Unfinished Business, about three Nisei Japanese Americans who challenged the Internment of Japanese Americans during World War II in court. In 1987, he wrote and directed the independent film, Living on Tokyo Time, which premiered in competition at the Sundance Film Festival and was theatrically released by Skouras Pictures.

In 1991, he won the Academy Award for Best Documentary (Short Subject) for Days of Waiting: The Life & Art of Estelle Ishigo, about Estelle Peck Ishigo, a Caucasian artist who accompanied her Japanese American husband to a Japanese internment camp. Okazaki continued to make documentary films for PBS and later with HBO. In 2006, he received his third Academy Award nomination for The Mushroom Club, a personal documentary about his journey to Japan to interview atomic bomb survivors on the 60th anniversary of the bombing of Hiroshima. He co-received the 2008 "Exceptional Merit in Nonfiction Filmmaking" Primetime Emmy Award for White Light/Black Rain: The Destruction of Hiroshima and Nagasaki, and his fourth Oscar nomination in 2009, for the documentary short The Conscience of Nhem En. His production company, Farallon Films, is based in Berkeley, California.

Okazaki was also involved as a multi-instrumentalist in a San Francisco punk rock music group called The Maids (1977–79), whose sole record, a single called 'Back to Bataan,' gained some notoriety by way of later punk music compilations.

Filmography

Personal life
Okazaki has been married since 1991 to writer Peggy Orenstein. They have a daughter, Daisy Tomoko, born in 2003.

References

External links
 
 Farallon Films Official Website

1952 births
Living people
People from Venice, Los Angeles
Venice High School (Los Angeles) alumni
American documentary filmmakers
American film directors of Japanese descent
San Francisco State University alumni
Directors of Best Documentary Short Subject Academy Award winners